R. A. Kowalski may refer to:
 Richard Kowalski (born 1963), astronomer
 Robert Kowalski (born 1941), logician and computer scientist

See also
 Kowalski, a Polish surname